Celso Benigno Luigi Costantini (3 April 1876 – 17 October 1958) was an Italian Roman Catholic cardinal and the founder of the Disciples of the Lord who served as the Apostolic Chancellor from 1954 until his death. He became a cardinal in 1953. He is best known for his work in China. Costantini dedicated himself to improving the work of missionaries and believed that evangelization in China belonged to the Chinese people. His time there heralded countless successes and he was careful never to involve himself in the complex politics between the Church and the state.

His cause for sainthood commenced on 24 June 2016 under Pope Francis and he has been titled as a Servant of God.

Early years
Celso Benigno Luigi Costantini was born on 3 April 1876 in Castions di Zoppola as the second of ten children to Costante Costantini (a building contractor) and Maddalena Altan. His brother Giovanni (1880-1956) became the Bishop of La Spezia.

He followed his father's trade as a mason and worked since 1887 in that trade before deciding to undergo ecclesial studies. He studied first from 1892 until 1897 at Portogruaro and then attended as a part-time student at the Academica di San Tommaso in Rome from 1897 until 1899. It was there that he obtained his doctorates in philosophical and theological studies in 1899. He was ordained to the priesthood in Portogruaro on 26 December 1899 and then did pastoral work until 1914 in Concordia where he was also elected as capitular vicar and as a chaplain for the Portogruaro hospital. In 1915 he founded the illustrated journal "Arte Cristiana" and served as its director until 1924. During World War I he served as a chaplain in the Italian Armed Forces since 12 December 1917. He served as the Concordia diocese's vicar general from 5 November 1918 to 30 April 1920 when he was made apostolic administrator for Fiume until a replacement bishop for that diocese could be found. Costantini was also friends with Agostino Gemelli and over time expressed his support for the convocation of a new ecumenical council though this would not happen until after his death. He also was close with Alcide De Gasperi and the two housed together at some stage in 1944.

China
He became the Titular Bishop of Hierapolis in 1921 and he received his episcopal consecration a month after from Cardinal Pietro La Fontaine with Angelo Bartolomasi and Luigi Paulini serving as the co-consecrators. Pope Pius XI appointed Costantini as the first Apostolic Delegate to China on 12 August 1922 and also made him Titular Archbishop of Theodosiopolis in Arcadia the following month. He met with Pius XI before his departure and with Cardinal Willem Marinus van Rossum who advised Costantini to implement all dimensions of Maximum illud, Pope Benedict XV's 1919 apostolic letter on the work of missionaries. Costantini arrived in Hong Kong on 8 November 1922. He later met the Foreign Minister Gu Weijun when he visited Beijing for the first time in mid-1923. He called the first episcopal conference in Shanghai in mid-1924 and made constitutions for the missions in China. He also helped found the Fu Jen Catholic college. He identified six indigenous Chinese candidates for episcopal ordination and established several regional major seminaries. He founded the Disciples of the Lord in 1927 and he became the apostolic administrator for Harbin in 1931 though returned to his homeland at that time and then to the United States to recover from several health issues. On 28 October 1926 he was present in the Sistine Chapel when Pius XI consecrated the first six Chinese bishops after he and the bishops-elect left from Shanghai on the previous 10 September.

Curial service
The archbishop left China in 1933 and entered the service of the Roman Curia where he was appointed to the Congregation for Propagation of Faith first as a consulter on 3 December 1933 and then to its leadership on 20 December 1935 as its second-in-command. He was the second-highest official of that department under Cardinal Pietro Fumasoni Biondi. In 1936 he was made an Assistant at the Pontifical Throne. Pope Pius XII created him Cardinal-Priest of Santi Nereo e Achilleo on 12 January 1953. Costantini was made a member of some of the curial departments including Oriental Churches and the Congregation for Rites. Several months later he was named as the Apostolic Chancellor and opted for the cardinalitial title of San Lorenzo in Damaso on 9 June 1958.

Death
He died of heart failure in Rome on 17 October 1958, three weeks after surgery, at the Villa Margherita Clinic in Via Massimo. His death followed that of Pope Pius XII and preceded the start of the conclave to choose his successor. Before his death, he told Cardinal Angelo Giuseppe Roncalli, soon to be elected pope, that he supported the candidacy of Gregorio Pietro Agagianian. He was buried next to his brother Bishop Giovanni Constantini in Zoppola. In 1959 his brother's remains were relocated to La Spezia.

Beatification process
The beatification process received support on 30 September 2016 from the Trivenetian Episcopal Conference who endorsed the cause which had opened some months prior. It opened under Pope Francis on 24 June 2016 after the Congregation for the Causes of Saints titled him as a Servant of God and transferred the forum of investigation from Rome to Concordia. The diocesan process was inaugurated on 17 October 2017 and is ongoing.

The current postulator for this cause is Father Ader Nasr and the vice-postulator is Father Simon ee-Kim chong.

It is predicted that the cause's progress will be slow due to the divergent China-Vatican relations.

References

Further reading
 Bruno Fabio Pighin (ed.) (2014), The Secrets of a Vatican Cardinal: Celso Constantini's Wartime Diaries, 1938-1947. McGill-Queen's University Press.

External links
 Hagiography Circle
 Celso Costantini's Contribution to the Localization and Inculturation of the Church in China
 Archbishop Costantini and The First Plenary Council of Shanghai (1924)
 Cardinal Celso Costantini and the Chinese Catholic Church

1876 births
1958 deaths
20th-century venerated Christians
Cardinals created by Pope Pius XII
Diplomats of the Holy See
Academic staff of Fu Jen Catholic University
20th-century Italian cardinals
Italian diarists
Italian military chaplains
Italian Servants of God
People from the Province of Pordenone
Royal Italian Army chaplains
World War I chaplains
Italian expatriates in China
Grand Crosses 1st class of the Order of Merit of the Federal Republic of Germany